North Dayi District (a.k.a. Dayi Dzigbe) is one of the eighteen districts in Volta Region, Ghana. Originally it was formerly part of the then-larger Kpando District on 10 March 1989, until the southern part of the district was split off to create North Dayi District on 28 June 2012; thus the remaining part was elevated to municipal district assembly status to become Kpando Municipal District on the same year. The district assembly is located in the western part of Volta Region and has Anfoega as its capital town.

Villages 
 Anfoega
 Vakpo
 Wusuta
 Tsrukpe
 Botoku
 Tsoxor
 Awate
 Aveme
 Tsyome Sabadu

External links
 [www.northdayidistrict.com - North Dayi District Alternate Website]
 North Dayi District Official Website

References

Districts of Volta Region

States and territories established in 2012